According to the Hebrew Bible, Jehoshaphat was the father of King Jehu and the son of Nimshi. There are some points in the Bible that Jehu is called the son of Nimshi only.

Amitai Baruchi-Unna suggests that he was Omri's grandson.

References

Books of Kings people
Books of Chronicles people